The 2017 BWF World Junior Championships (officially known as the Blibli.com Yonex-Sunrise BWF World Junior Championships 2017 for sponsorship reasons) was the nineteenth tournament of the BWF World Junior Championships. It was held in Yogyakarta, Indonesia at the Among Rogo Sports Hall between 9 and 22 October 2017.

Host city selection
Bilbao (Spain) and Yogyakarta (Indonesia) originally submitted bids to host the 2016 competition. Badminton World Federation later awarded the event to Bilbao while Yogyakarta was appointed as host for the next edition. According to the Indonesian delegation, the Spanish bid for the 2016 edition was approved due to fears of political instability should Bilbao awarded the 2017 edition.

Medalists

Medal table

References

External links
 BWF World Junior Championships 2017 at Tournamentsoftware.com
 BWF World Junior Mixed Team Championships 2017 at Tournamentsoftware.com

 
BWF World Junior Championships
International sports competitions hosted by Indonesia
Badminton tournaments in Indonesia
BWF World Junior Championships
BWF World Junior Championships
BWF World Junior Championships
Sports competitions in Yogyakarta
BWF World Junior Championships